Dal Khalsa may refer to:

 Dal Khalsa (Sikh Army), the Sikh army that operated in 17th and 18th-century Punjab
 Dal Khalsa (International), a Sikh political organization based in Amritsar, Punjab, India
 Dal Khalsa UK, a unit of the organization based in London

See also
 Khalsa